Ridin' the Wind is a 1925 American silent Western film directed by Del Andrews and starring Fred Thomson, Jacqueline Gadsdon, and David Dunbar.

Plot
As described in a film magazine review, a young rancher who loves the sheriff’s daughter is deputized to help break up a bandit gang. He captures the leader and learns that it is his brother, who is supposed to be in college. He clears his brother and wins the affections of the young woman.

Cast

References

Bibliography
 Donald W. McCaffrey & Christopher P. Jacobs. Guide to the Silent Years of American Cinema. Greenwood Publishing, 1999.

External links
 

1925 films
1925 Western (genre) films
American black-and-white films
Films directed by Del Andrews
Film Booking Offices of America films
Silent American Western (genre) films
1920s English-language films
1920s American films